Nitrobacter winogradskyi is a gram-negative nitrite-oxidizing bacteria from the genus of Nitrobacter.

References

External links
Type strain of Nitrobacter winogradskyi at BacDive -  the Bacterial Diversity Metadatabase

Nitrobacteraceae
Bacteria described in 1917